Lalta is an administrative ward in the Chemba District of the Dodoma Region of Tanzania. According to the 2002 census, the ward has a total population of 7,537.

References

Wards of Dodoma Region